Homayun (also Romanized as Homāyūn) is a village in Taham Rural District, in the Central District of Zanjan County, Zanjan Province, Iran. At the 2006 census, its population was 794, in 197 families.

References 

Populated places in Zanjan County